Omar Shendi (1915 – 23 April 1992) was an Egyptian footballer who played as a defender for Zamalek. He also played for the Egypt national team, and represented his country in the 1936 Summer Olympics.

Honours
Zamalek
 Egypt Cup: 1937–38, 1940–41, 1942–43, 1943–44
 Cairo League: 1939–40, 1940–41, 1943–44, 1944–45, 1945–46, 1946–47, 1948–49

References

1915 births
1992 deaths
Egyptian footballers
Association football defenders
Egypt international footballers
Zamalek SC players
Olympic footballers of Egypt
Footballers at the 1936 Summer Olympics
Ittihad FC managers
Qadsia SC managers
Egyptian football managers
Kuwait Premier League managers
Expatriate football managers in Kuwait
Expatriate football managers in Saudi Arabia
Egyptian expatriate sportspeople in Kuwait
Egyptian expatriate sportspeople in Saudi Arabia